The Scout and Guide movement in Ghana is served by:
 The Ghana Girl Guides Association, member of the World Association of Girl Guides and Girl Scouts
 The Ghana Scout Association, member of the World Organization of the Scout Movement
 The Baden-Powell Scouts' Association, member of the World Federation of Independent Scouts

International Scouting units in Ghana
In addition, there are American Boy Scouts in Accra, linked to the Direct Service branch of the Boy Scouts of America, which supports units around the world.